The Carbonaro Effect is an American hidden camera-magic reality television series that premiered on TruTV on April 1, 2014. It follows magician Michael Carbonaro as he stages elaborate illusions and pranks on everyday people while being filmed by hidden cameras.

Series overview

Episodes

Season 1 (2014–15)

Season 2 (2015–16)

Season 3 (2017–18)

Season 4 (2018–19)

Season 5 (2019–20)

Double Takes

Specials

References

External links

Lists of television episodes